Lles may refer to:

 Lles (municipality), a municipality in Catalonia, officially named "Lles de Cerdanya" in Catalan
 Lles (ski resort)
 Ein Shemer Airfield (ICAO: LLES)

See also 

 Iles
 , the French term for "islands"